Margaret Bowman (February 14, 1928–August 13, 2018) was an American actor.

Career 
Bowman's early career included musical theater in Nashville, Tennessee and Stages Repertory Theater in Houston, Texas. A method actor, she trained at the American Academy of Dramatic Arts in Pasadena, California, while in her 50s, when she "decided to reinvent" herself after spending the first part of her adult life as a homemaker. 

Bowman was primarily a character actor for film and television. Her first on-screen role was "Mrs. Flora Hawkins" in The Fulfillment of Mary Gray (1989). Between 1989 and 2019, Bowman primarily appeared in bit roles, such as, "Old Nanny" in three episodes of A Woman of Independent Means (1995), and as "Fat Lady" in The Lone Ranger (2013). Bowman would spend her free time observing people and inventing backstories for the characters she imagined they were, saying, "If you want to be a good character actor, you have to observe the people around you." In 1995, Bowman was cast by Tommy Lee Jones in the TNT TV movie The Good Old Boys, as "an old woman, Mrs. Faversham, whose mind has gone." Jones, who had a reputation for being cantankerous, called her work "exquisite."

One of her most notable roles was as the "T-Bone Waitress" in the critically acclaimed film Hell or High Water (2016). Bowman said she "had the character in mind before [she] even auditioned," basing it partly on her favorite waitress and partly on her own mother, who "waited tables to support herself, her mother and three daughters" and "then I came along and waited tables to support my family many years ago, so I know what it’s like to stand all day and have your back hurt and your feet hurt." In an interview with the Houston Chronicle, the newspaper described her performance as "scene-stealing." The LA Times said, "She may be an unnamed waitress in Hell or High Water’s diner scene but, boy, does she leave an impression." Actor Michael McKean said, "it’s one of the most hilarious scenes on film this year. There’s an actress named Margaret Bowman, who had a bit part in Waiting for Guffman. But in this, she just nails the world’s worst dragon waitress. You just fall in love with her. She has one little scene and she kind of steals the picture.”

Personal life 
Bowman raised six children with her husband, Jay, to whom she was married for 68 years.

She sang bass in a barbershop quartet for "many years."

Filmography

References

External links 

20th-century American actresses
21st-century American actresses
Actresses from Texas
American film actresses
American stage actresses
American television actresses
People from Humble, Texas
1928 births

2018 deaths